Vogance is a village in the municipality of Bujanovac, Serbia. According to the 2002 census, the town has a population of 51 people. It is situated by the Pčinja river.

Demographics
The village is inhabited by Serbs.

References

External links

Populated places in Pčinja District